Steve Kaiser is an American politician. He is a Republican member of the Arizona Senate. He previously served as state representative in Arizona's 15th district. He was elected to the seat after incumbent Republican John Allen decided to run for Maricopa County treasurer. He and Justin Wilmeth won in a twoseat election in 2020, both defeating Democrat Kristin DybvigPawelko by over 11,000 votes. He ran for and was elected to the State Senate in 2022.

References

Living people
Republican Party members of the Arizona House of Representatives
21st-century American politicians
Year of birth missing (living people)